is a former Japanese football player.

Playing career
Muramatsu was born in Shizuoka Prefecture on June 13, 1969. After graduating from Tokyo University of Agriculture, he joined Urawa Reds in 1992. He played many matches in 1992 J.League Cup. Although he played 13 matches in 1993, he could hardly play in the match from 1994. He moved to Japan Football League club Fujitsu in 1996. He retired end of 1996 season.

Club statistics

References

External links

1969 births
Living people
Tokyo University of Agriculture alumni
Association football people from Shizuoka Prefecture
Japanese footballers
J1 League players
Urawa Red Diamonds players
Association football defenders